Malý Čepčín is a village and municipality in Turčianske Teplice District in the Žilina Region of northern central Slovakia.

History
In historical records the village was first mentioned in 1254.

Geography
The municipality lies at an altitude of 465 metres and covers an area of 3.091 km². It has a population of about 519 people.

External links
https://www.webcitation.org/5QjNYnAux?url=http://www.statistics.sk/mosmis/eng/run.html

Villages and municipalities in Turčianske Teplice District